Gabriela Svobodová  (born as Sekajová on February 27, 1953, in Kremnica) is a former Czechoslovak cross-country skier who competed during the 1970s until 1984. She won a silver medal in the 4 × 5 km relay at the 1984 Winter Olympics in Sarajevo and a bronze medal in the same event at the 1974 FIS Nordic World Ski Championships.

Svobodová is the mother of Gabriela Soukalová, a biathlete competing for the Czech national team.

Cross-country skiing results
All results are sourced from the International Ski Federation (FIS).

Olympic Games
 1 medal – (1 silver)

World Championships
 1 medal – (1 bronze)

World Cup

Season standings

Individual podiums
1 podium

Team podiums
 1 podium 

Note:  Until the 1994 Olympics, Olympic races were included in the World Cup scoring system.

References

External links
 
 
 

1953 births
Living people
Czech female cross-country skiers
Czechoslovak female cross-country skiers
Olympic silver medalists for Czechoslovakia
Cross-country skiers at the 1976 Winter Olympics
Cross-country skiers at the 1980 Winter Olympics
Cross-country skiers at the 1984 Winter Olympics
Olympic medalists in cross-country skiing
Medalists at the 1984 Winter Olympics
People from Kremnica
Sportspeople from the Banská Bystrica Region
Olympic cross-country skiers of Czechoslovakia